Guerbet is a France-based manufacturer of contrast agents used in medical imaging. The company was founded in 1926 by André Guerbet, the son of Marcel Guerbet who in 1901 discovered Lipiodol – the first iodinated X-ray contrast agent.

In 2017 Guerbet’s revenues were €807.1 million. It employs over 2,700 people worldwide and has manufacturing facilities in France, Ireland, Canada, Macedonia, the United States and Brazil. The company’s headquarters are located in Villepinte, a suburb of Paris and its shares are included in the CAC Small stock index.

In July 2015, Guerbet announced the takeover of Mallinckrodt's contrast media and application systems divisions. The acquisition was completed in November 2015.

References

External links
 

Healthcare companies of France
Health care companies established in 1926
French companies established in 1926
Companies listed on Euronext Paris